Hoseyn Aqa (also Romanized as Ḩoseyn Āqā) is a village in Jastun Shah Rural District, Hati District, Lali County, Khuzestan Province, Iran. At the 2006 census, its population was 104, in 21 families.

References 

Populated places in Lali County